Starch synthase (maltosyl-transferring) (alpha1,4-glucan:maltose-1-P maltosyltransferase, GMPMT) is an enzyme with systematic name alpha-maltose 1-phosphate:(1->4)-alpha-D-glucan 4-alpha-D-maltosyltransferase. This enzyme catalyses the following chemical reaction

 alpha-maltose 1-phosphate + [(1->4)-alpha-D-glucosyl]n  phosphate + [(1->4)-alpha-D-glucosyl]n+2

The enzyme from the bacterium Mycobacterium smegmatis is specific for maltose.

References

External links 

EC 2.4.99